The 2015 Atlantic Sun women's basketball tournament was the 29th edition of the Atlantic Sun Conference Championship. It took place from March 6, 2015 through March 15, 2015 in several arenas. All games took place at the higher-seeded of the two teams competing.

Format
The A-Sun Championship is a six-day single-elimination tournament. Eight teams will compete in the championship. 

On July 22. 2014 The A-Sun announced Northern Kentucky will be eligible for all conference postseason championships for which their teams qualify starting with the upcoming 2014-15 academic year, as part of their transition to Division I from Division II, The Norse must still complete the four-year reclassification period before becoming eligible for NCAA Championships. The change in A-Sun policy arose after NCAA clarification that a conference may set specific criteria allowing its highest ranked finisher to be the AQ recipient if a non-eligible team were to participate and win the conference postseason tournament. Prior policy had determined that the conference would lose its AQ if an ineligible team won the tournament.

Seeds

Bracket

See also
 2015 Atlantic Sun men's basketball tournament

References

External links 
Atlantic Sun Men's Basketball Championship Details

Tournament
ASUN women's basketball tournament